Valeriu Stoica (born 1 October 1953, Bucharest, Socialist Republic of Romania) is a Romanian politician and academic. A professor of civil law at the University of Bucharest, he became a member of the National Liberal Party (PNL) in 1990, and was first vice-president of the party between 1997 and 2001 and then president for a brief period of time between 2001 and 2002. 

Stoica was the Minister of Justice for 4 years during the CDR governance (1996–2000), contributing to the implementation of several reforms, especially regarding the protection of private property. In 2006, he left the PNL and joined Theodor Stolojan's Liberal Democrats (PLD).

References 

National Liberal Party (Romania) politicians
Romanian Ministers of Justice
Romanian jurists
Politicians from Bucharest
Academic staff of the University of Bucharest
Gheorghe Lazăr National College (Bucharest) alumni
1953 births
Living people